Jhon Jairo Sánchez Enriquez (born 30 July 1999 in Ecuador) is an Ecuadorian footballer who play as a winger for C.S. Emelec.

Career

In an interview with Elcomercio.com, Sánchez stated that he is not a goalscorer and prefers to support his teammates. He also said that he did not expect to play in an international club tournament (the 2019 Copa Sudamericana) so soon with Independiente del Valle, having played in the second division beforehand.

In 2020, Sánchez was listed in World Soccer magazine's 500 Most Important Players.

In August 30, 2021, Sánchez was announced for Vasco da Gama on loan from Independiente del Valle.

References

External links
 Jhon Jairo Sánchez at Soccerway

Ecuadorian footballers
Living people
1999 births
Association football wingers
Association football midfielders
Campeonato Brasileiro Série B players
C.S.D. Independiente del Valle footballers
CR Vasco da Gama players